The Mycological Society of America (MSA) is a learned society that serves as the professional organization of mycologists in the U.S. and Canada. It was founded in 1932. The Society's constitution states that "The purpose of the Society is to promote and advance the science of mycology and to foster and encourage research and education in mycology in all its aspects."  Members of the MSA meet annually to exchange information and build understanding of fungi.

Publications

Mycologia is the official scholarly journal of the Mycological Society of America. Six issues are published each year; members receive a subscription as a benefit of membership. Both members and non-members are invited to submit scholarly manuscripts for publication.  Mycologia issues are available to subscribers online as well as in print. 

Inoculum is the Society's bimonthly newsletter. Though published in print through 2006,  Inoculum is published online only and is freely accessible through the MSA website.

The Mycological Society of America also publishes Mycologia Memoirs, an occasional series of scholarly monographs on aspects of fungal biology.

Membership

In 2006, MSA membership included about 1190 members drawn from 51 different countries. The society's constitution states that "Membership in the Society shall be open to persons or organizations who share the stated purposes of the Society." Members are eligible for many different annual awards that recognize scholarship, pedagogy, and research potential. The Mycological Society of America may bestow honorary membership on particularly distinguished mycologists who reside outside North America.

Honorary members
1951, Ernst A Gäumann, Switzerland d.1963 – Mycologia 57:1-5, 1965 
1955, Franz Petrak, Austria d.1973 
1965, G.C. Ainsworth, United Kingdom d.1998 – Mycologia 91(4): 714, 1999; J.A. von Arx, Netherlands d.1988; C.T. Ingold, United Kingdom; Grace M. Waterhouse, United Kingdom d.1996 
1966 Lilian E. Hawker, United Kingdom d.1991; J.A. Nannfeldt, Sweden d.1985 – Mycologia 78: 692-693, 1986 
1973, M.B. Ellis, United Kingdom d.1996; Roger Heim, France d.1979 – Mycologia 72:1063-1064, 1980; Keisuke Tubaki, Japan 
1983, R.W.G. Dennis, United Kingdom d.2003; R. Kühner, France d.1996 – Mycologia 91(4): 707, 1999; Emil Müller, Switzerland; C. V. Subramanian, India 
1985, John Webster, United Kingdom 
1987, Colin Booth, United Kingdom; Gastón Guzmán, Mexico; Meinhard Moser, Austria d.2002 - Inoculum 53(6):14. 2002. 
1988, Leif Ryvarden, Norway 
1989, Nils Fries, Sweden d.1994 – Inoculum 46(3): 3, 1995.
1992, E.J.H. Corner, United Kingdom d.1996 – Mycologia 90(4): 732, 1998; Vera Holubová-Jechová, Czech Republic d.1993 – Ceská Mykologie 47(1): 83, 1993. 
1993, Lennart Holm, Sweden; Erast Parmasto, Estonia; Josef Poelt, Austria d.1995 – Inoculum 46(3): 3, 1995; Jorge E. Wright, Argentina
1994, David L. Hawksworth, United Kingdom; Brian C. Sutton, United Kingdom; Joseph Wessels, Netherlands 
1995, Karl Esser, Germany 
1996, Junta Sugiyama, Japan; Anthony P.J. Trinci, United Kingdom 
1997, Walter Gams, Netherlands 
1998, Ludmila Marvanová, Czech Republic; Roy Watling, United Kingdom 
2000, David J. Read, United Kingdom 
2001, Birgitt Nordbring-Hertz, Sweden; John Pitt, Australia 
2002, Ove E. Eriksson, Sweden 
2003, Jeremy Burdon, Australia; Tsuguo Hongo, Japan; Egon Horak, Switzerland 
2004, Rob Samson, The Netherlands
2005, Franz Oberwinkler, Germany
2006, Michael Wingfield, South Africa
2007, Jan Stenlid, Sweden
2008, Angela Restrepo, Colombia; Gioconda San-Blas, Venezuela

See also
 North American Mycological Association, MSA's sister society for amateur mycologists

External links
 Official webpage of the Mycological Society of America
 Mycologia, the scholarly journal of the MSA

References

Mycology organizations
Professional associations based in the United States
Learned societies of the United States
Natural Science Collections Alliance members
1932 establishments in the United States
Scientific organizations established in 1932